The Ungureni is a right tributary of the river Geamărtălui in Romania. It flows into the Geamărtălui near Băleasa.

References

Rivers of Romania
Rivers of Dolj County
Rivers of Olt County